Kaattu Rani is a 1965 Indian Tamil-language film produced by Sandow M. M. A. Chinnappa Thevar via Dhandayuthapani Films and directed by M. A. Thirumugam. The film stars S. A. Ashokan, K. Balaji, K. R. Vijaya and Sheela. It was released on 4 February 1965.

Plot

Cast 
The following lists are compiled from the database of Film News Anandan and from the film credits

S. A. Ashokan
K. Balaji
V. K. Ramasamy
R. S. Manohar
S. V. Ramdas
Sandow M. M. A. Chinnappa Thevar
Gemini Balu
"En Thangai" T. S. Natarajan
K. R. Vijaya
Sheela
M. Kannan
S. S. Natarajan
Gopuraj
S. P. Nagarajan
"Nellai" Rajan
G. Krishnasamy
Justin
Shankar
Marthandan
S. A. Azhakesan

Production 
Sandow M. M. A. Chinnappa Thevar was producing films under Devar Films starring M. G. Ramachandran and K. V. Mahadevan composing the music. He floated Dhandayuthapani Films to produce films with a different team. This was one such production under the new banner.

Soundtrack 
Music was composed by P. S. Diwakar and the lyrics were penned by Kannadasan, assisted by Panchu Arunachalam and Rama Muthaiah.

Release and reception 
Kaattu Rani was released on 4 February 1965. Writing for Sport and Pastime, T. M. Ramachandran called the film "a poor imitation of Hatari" and criticised Thirumugam's direction. The Indian Express called it "old Sandow Chinnappa Devar and his jungle felines box office formula" and added, "Someone said this is a mass film and not for the discerning few; so let us leave it at that".

References

External links 

1960s Tamil-language films
Films directed by M. A. Thirumugam
Films scored by K. V. Mahadevan
Films set in forests